Timlyuy is a rural locality (a selo) in Kabansky District, Republic of Buryatia, Russia. The population was 730 as of 2010. There are 10 streets.

Geography 
Timlyuy is located 11 km southwest of Kabansk (the district's administrative centre) by road. Kamensk is the nearest rural locality.

References 

Rural localities in Kabansky District